The 2019 East Hertfordshire District Council election took place on 2 May 2019 to elect all members of East Hertfordshire District Council in England. The Conservatives retained control of the council, but lost 10 seats.

Summary

|-

Ward results

Bishop's Stortford All Saints

Bishop's Stortford Central

Bishop's Stortford Meads

Bishop's Stortford Silverleys

Bishop's Stortford South

Braughing

Buntingford

Datchworth and Aston

Great Amwell

Hertford Bengeo

Hertford Castle

Hertford Heath

Hertford Kingsmead

Hertford Rural North

Hertford Rural South

Hertford Sele

Hunsdon

Little Hadham

Much Hadham

Mundens and Cottered

Puckeridge

Sawbridgeworth

Stanstead Abbotts

Thundridge and Standon

Walkern

Ware Chadwell

Ware Christchurch

Ware St Mary's

Ware Trinity

Watton-at-Stone

By-elections

Bishop's Stortford All Saints

References 

East Herts
East Hertfordshire District Council elections